The North Carolina Secretary of State is an elected constitutional officer in the executive branch of the government of the U.S. state of North Carolina, and is fourth in the line of succession to the office of Governor of North Carolina. The secretary maintains the official journal of the North Carolina General Assembly and is responsible for overseeing land records, chartering corporations, and administering some commercial regulations. The incumbent is Elaine Marshall, a Democrat and the first woman elected to the office.

The office traces its origins to the office of the Colonial Secretary of Carolina, created in 1665, and was formally created as an office in 1776. Since 1868, the secretary has been popularly elected every four years. The office's responsibilities—determined by statute—have varied over its existence. Historically weaker than their contemporaries around the United States, the secretary does not oversee elections in the state. They lead the Department of Secretary of State and sit on the North Carolina Council of State.

History of the office
In 1665 the Lord Proprietors of the Province of Carolina created the office of the Colonial Secretary of Carolina. The inaugural secretary, Richard Cobthrop, never travelled to America, but most of the subsequent 23 secretaries came to Carolina. In 1675 the secretary became responsible to the King of England, and was largely tasked with clerical duties relating to land ownership. Following the United States Declaration of Independence, North Carolina created a constitution in 1776 which provided for the North Carolina General Assembly to "triennially appoint a secretary for this State." The Assembly appointed James Glasgow to the office in December and reappointed him the following year. He held the office for over 20 years before resigning due to allegations that he had issued fraudulent land warrants. William Hill served as secretary from 1811 to 1857, setting the record tenure for the office until the 20th century. When the North Carolina State House caught fire in 1831, he saved many of the office's records.

In 1868 North Carolina created a new constitution, which provided for the popular election of the secretary of state with four-year terms and no term limits. Thad A. Eure held the office from 1936 to 1989, setting the latest record tenure. Most secretaries of the state have come from eastern North Carolina. Rufus L. Edmisten, sworn-in in 1989, was the first one to come from the western portion of the state. Janice H. Faulkner, appointed by the Governor of North Carolina in 1996 to fill the vacancy created by Edmisten's resignation, became the first woman to hold the office. Elaine Marshall, who assumed the office in 1997, was the first woman ever elected to a North Carolina statewide executive office. Since the passage of the Executive Reorganization Act of 1971, the secretary's agency has been the Department of Secretary of State.

The office's responsibilities—determined by statute—have varied over its existence. The secretariat managed the issuance of land grants from its colonial creation until 1957. In 1831 the secretary was briefly designated state librarian. In 1868 a Bureau of Statistics, Agriculture, and Immigration was placed within the office and remained there until a separate Department of Agriculture was created in 1877. The office has also at times been responsible for insurance regulation, vehicle registration, and collection of the state gas tax. Until the General Assembly was moved to the State Legislative Building and given a professional staff in the 1960s, the secretary was responsible for assisting it in several matters, including seating assignment in the legislative chambers, enrolling acts and resolutions before their ratification, and indexing and printing the session laws. A 1968 constitutional study commission recommended making the governor responsible for the selection of the secretary to reduce voters' burden by shortening the ballot, but this proposal was disregarded by the General Assembly when it revised the state constitution in 1971. The State Board of Elections briefly operated under the secretary from 1971 to 1972.

Powers, duties, and structure

The secretary of state is a constitutional officer. Article III, Section 7, of the Constitution of North Carolina stipulates the popular election of the secretary of state every four years. The office holder is not subject to term limits. In the event of a vacancy in the office, the Governor of North Carolina has the authority to appoint a successor until a candidate is elected at the next general election for members of the General Assembly. Per Article III, Section 8 of the constitution, the secretary sits on the Council of State. They maintain the schedule and agenda of council meetings. They are ex officio a member of the Local Government Commission and Capital Planning Commission. They are fourth in line of succession to the governor. 

Historically, the North Carolina Secretary of State has been weaker than their contemporaries around the United States. Unlike in other states, where the secretary of state serves as the chief elections officer, in North Carolina the State Board of Elections administers elections independently of other agencies. With regards to elections, the secretary is responsible for storing official copies of election results sent to them by the State Board of Elections and arranging the meeting of North Carolina's presidential electors every four years. The secretary is charged with attending sessions of the General Assembly to obtain possession of laws passed by it, and maintains the official journals of each house. They also administer the North Carolina Securities Act and the Uniform Commercial Code, charter corporations, register trademarks, manage land records, and register legislative lobbyists. They are empowered to investigate violations of lobbying laws and impose civil fines not exceeding $5,000 for infractions. The secretary commissions notary publics in the state, and they are empowered to administer oaths of office to public officials and law enforcement officers. They attend the ceremonies in which an outgoing governor turns over the Great Seal of North Carolina to their successor.

The Department of Secretary of State has several divisions and sections: corporations division, publications division, securities division, trademarks section, Uniform Commercial Code section, authentications section, charitable solicitation licensing section, land records section, lobbyist compliance division, and notary public section. As of December 2022, the department has 163 employees retained under the terms of the State Human Resources Act. As with all Council of State officers, the secretary of state's salary is fixed by the General Assembly and cannot be reduced during their term of office. In 2022, the secretary's annual salary was $146,421.

List of secretaries of state

References

Works cited

External links
 Official Site
 Biennial reports of the NC Secretary of State, 1867-1948
 Partial History of NC Secretary of State Races at OurCampaigns.com

1665 establishments in the Thirteen Colonies